Karsten Brannasch (born 17 August 1966 in Altdöbern) is a German bobsledder who competed in the early 1990s. He won a gold medal in the four-man event with his teammates Harald Czudaj, Olaf Hampel and Alexander Szelig at the 1994 Winter Olympics in Lillehammer.

References 
 Bobsleigh four-man Olympic medalists for 1924, 1932-56, and since 1964
 Databaseolympics.com profile

1966 births
Living people
People from Altdöbern
People from Bezirk Cottbus
German male bobsledders
Sportspeople from Brandenburg
Olympic bobsledders of Germany
Olympic gold medalists for Germany
Bobsledders at the 1994 Winter Olympics
Olympic medalists in bobsleigh
Medalists at the 1994 Winter Olympics